A leadership election for the Freedom Union (US)  was held in the Czech Republic on 17 January 1998. Jan Ruml was elected the first leader of the party when he defeated businessman Karel Cieslar and Mayor of Kutná Hora Ivo Šanc.

Background
Freedom Union was founded in 1998 as a split from the Civic Democratic Party. It was a result of a political crisis that started during 1997.

Voting

Ruml received 214 votes. His rivals Cieslar and Šanc received 47 and 29 votes respectively. 290 delegates voted.

References

1998
1998 elections in the Czech Republic
Indirect elections
Freedom Union leadership election